The Courage to Be Free: Florida's Blueprint for America's Revival is a non-fiction book by politician Ron DeSantis and published by HarperCollins in 2023. A self-described memoir, The Courage to Be Free is DeSantis's second book, following Dreams from Our Founding Fathers: First Principles in the Age of Obama (2011). The Courage to be Free outlines DeSantis's vision for the United States.

DeSantis criticizes the "woke agenda" and the elite, taking issue with public health measures implemented during the COVID-19 pandemic, including school closures during the pandemic. He references The Walt Disney Company and the company's response to the Florida Parental Rights in Education Act, devoting an entire chapter to the topic. The Courage to Be Free marks a departure from his previous book; whereas Dreams from Our Founding Fathers criticized Barack Obama for executive overreach, DeSantis defends his use of executive powers to counteract "woke" corporations.

The Courage to Be Free debuted at number one on The New York Times Best Seller list and Amazon's bestsellers list. The New York Times critic Jennifer Szalai criticized DeSantis's "bullying sense of superiority" and the book's prose, which was contrasted with DeSantis's admission into Yale University. DeSantis's subsequent book tour following the release of the book has been seen as a precursor to a potential bid for president in the 2024 United States presidential election.

Contents summary
In The Courage to Be Free, Ron DeSantis critiques the "woke agenda" and the elite; DeSantis specifically names Anthony Fauci and claims that public health measures implemented during the COVID-19 pandemic were "heavy-handed". Throughout the book, DeSantis shows contempt for other institutions, including legacy media, the Democratic Party (described as a "woke dumpster fire"), and Big Tech. Regarding Donald Trump, DeSantis avoids mentioning Trump's presidency, although indirectly bemoans him for a perceived lack of inaction; "Here we had a unified Republican government for the first time in more than a decade, and yet so much of the time was frittered away on matters like the conspiracy theory that Donald Trump’s campaign had colluded with Russia, which GOP-led committees investigated for two years".

On the COVID-19 pandemic in Florida, DeSantis advocates for a relaxed position on businesses and schools, and suggests the United States government should investigate the origin of COVID-19. DeSantis blames Richard Corcoran, the state's education commissioner during the pandemic, for shutting schools down, and states that he "prodded" Corcoran to open schools back up, based on data from Sweden and South Korea. Additionally, he criticizes Fauci for the federal government's response to the pandemic, suggesting that the models used by the White House Coronavirus Task Force were overexaggerated.

In comparison to his previous novel, Dreams from Our Founding Fathers: First Principles in the Age of Obama (2011), DeSantis argues for more executive power, boasting his use of the veto to control Florida's House of Representatives and Senate, and rejecting the Freedom Caucus's position on a small government, of which DeSantis was a member of. DeSantis justifies his use of executive power to police "private institutions [that] wield an enormous amount of power over society", and quotes himself telling Ultimate Fighting Championship (UFC) president Dana White that he would "overrule any mayor that gives [the UFC] a hard time". By contrast, in Dreams from Our Founding Fathers, he criticizes Barack Obama for executive overreach, accusing Kathleen Sebelius of using her power to "intimidate private businesses for engaging in speech she didn't like".

Although described as a memoir, The Courage to be Free mentions few details of DeSantis's personal life; for instance, his 2016 United States Senate candidacy bid is omitted. Mentioned in the book is DeSantis's political philosophy, including an overhaul of the federal government, such as reclassifying federal employees such that the president could fire them at will. DeSantis promotes his efforts to relocate the United States Embassy of Israel to Jerusalem and combat Chinese influence in Florida.

Composition and publication

The Courage to Be Free was announced by HarperCollins on November 30, 2022, following rumors that DeSantis may write a memoir. Prior to The Courage to Be Free, DeSantis wrote Dreams from Our Founding Fathers: First Principles in the Age of Obama (2011), using the Constitution to rebuke the presidency of Barack Obama. The book references Obama's memoir Dreams from My Father: A Story of Race and Inheritance (1995). Prior to the book's release, an excerpt was published in the New York Post; additionally, two authorized leaks regarding DeSantis's relationship with former president Donald Trump and a private phone call DeSantis had with Bob Chapek, the former CEO of The Walt Disney Company were published on Fox News.

The Courage to Be Free was published on February 28, 2023, in hardcover format by HarperCollins under the Broadside Books imprint. Broadside Books had previously published books by other conservative political figures, including Jared Kushner's political memoir Breaking History: A White House Memoir (2022).

Sales and reception
The Courage to Be Free debuted at number 1 on The New York Times Best Seller list and Amazon's bestsellers list. According to Broadside Books, the publisher printed 250,000 hardcover copies of DeSantis's book. To promote the book, DeSantis made several stops across the United States. At one such event at the Ronald Reagan Presidential Library in Simi Valley, California, protesters gathered outside the entrance. DeSantis's book tour has been seen as an advancement towards a potential bid for president in the 2024 United States presidential election; DeSantis is expected to announce his decision no later than May 2023.

In a review for The New York Times, Jennifer Szalai criticizes the memoir for being filled with bland platitudes and culture war "Mad Libs". She points out that DeSantis has changed a lot over the past decade, from being a libertarian to being focused on social conservatism. Szalai also suggests that DeSantis's attempts to portray himself as a courageous leader are undermined by his support for policies that are chilling and unfree.

The memoir was also reviewed by Manuel Roig-Franzia in The Washington Post. Roig-Franzia notes that in the book, DeSantis rarely mentions former President Donald Trump, but when he does, it's mostly in positive terms, giving him credit for moving the U.S. Embassy in Israel to Jerusalem, making "stellar" judicial appointments, and providing hurricane relief funding to Florida. He also points out that the book's introduction, which is 12 pages long, uses the word "elite" more than 20 times.

References

Ron DeSantis
2023 non-fiction books
American political books
Broadside Books books